Fred Roe (January 18, 1889 – May 6, 1968) was an American polo player. He competed in the polo tournament at the 1924 Summer Olympics winning a silver medal.  He graduated from Yale College and Harvard Business School.

References

External links
 

1889 births
1968 deaths
American polo players
Polo players at the 1924 Summer Olympics
Olympic medalists in polo
Olympic polo players of the United States
Olympic silver medalists for the United States
Medalists at the 1924 Summer Olympics
People from Coke County, Texas
Sportspeople from Texas
Yale College alumni
Harvard Business School alumni